Romania competed at the 2011 World Championships in Athletics from August 27 to September 4 in Daegu, South Korea.
A team of 8 athletes was
announced to represent the country
in the event. The team is led by triple jumper Marian Oprea and discus
thrower Nicoleta Grasu who won the bronze medal in the last championships.

Results

Men

Women

References

External links
Official local organising committee website
Official IAAF competition website

Nations at the 2011 World Championships in Athletics
World Championships in Athletics
Romania at the World Championships in Athletics